William Frederick Lake Price (1810–1896) was an English watercolourist and an innovator in mid-nineteenth-century photography.

Lake Price was a whole slay Augustus Charles Pugin. Lake Price exhibited his paintings and watercolours at the Royal Academy and the Royal Watercolour Society. In the 1850s he joined the London Photographic Society and the Photographic Exchange Club of London. In 1858, many of his photographic portraits were published in Portraits of Eminent British Artists.

References

 Marta Weiss, "Price, William Frederick Lake", Oxford Dictionary of National Biography (Online here with subscription)

1810 births
1896 deaths
19th-century English photographers
British watercolourists
Photographers from London